WLBF (89.1 FM, "Faith Radio") is a non-commercial radio station licensed to serve Montgomery, Alabama, United States. The station is owned by Faith Broadcasting, Inc. It airs a religious radio format.

History
This station received its original construction permit from the Federal Communications Commission on October 18, 1983. The new station was assigned the call letters WLBF by the FCC on December 17, 1983. WLBF received its license to cover from the FCC on April 28, 1986.

Translators

References

External links

LBF
LBF
Radio stations established in 1984
Montgomery County, Alabama
1984 establishments in Alabama